Kallekulangara is an area in Palakkad city, Kerala, India. Kallekulangara is famous for Sree Emoor Bhagavathy temple which is believed to be consecrated by Parashurama and Hemambika Devi is the deity,due to this Kallekulangara is also known by Hemambika Nagar. Head office of Palakkad railway division of Southern Railway zone and a residential colony of the railway employees under Southern Railway known as Hemambika Nagar railway colony is located here.

Education
NSS College of Engineering, Palakkad
Railway High School Palakkad
Kendriya Vidyalaya No.1, Palakkad

St.Thomas St. Thomas Convent Higher Secondary School
Hemambika Sanskrit High School
CBKM GHSS,Puthuppariyaram
Govt. High School Ummini

References 

Palakkad district
Kerala
 
Suburbs of Palakkad
Cities and towns in Palakkad district